Witches Brew may refer to:
A synonym for potion
Witches' Brew (novel), a 1995 fantasy novel written by Terry Brooks
Witches Brew (record label), an underground European record label
Witches' Brew (film), a 1980 comedy/horror starring Teri Garr, Richard Benjamin, and Lana Turner
"Witches' Brew" (song), a 2011 song by Katy B
Witches' Brew, a 1970s Halloween children's song by Hap Palmer
Witches' Brew, a song from the musical Hallelujah, Baby!